Jean Bourdichon (1457 or 1459 – 1521) was a French miniature painter and manuscript illuminator at the court of France between the end of the 15th century and the start of the 16th century, in the reigns of Louis XI of France, Charles VIII of France, Louis XII of France and Francis I of France. He was probably born in Tours, and was a pupil of Jean Fouquet.  He died in Tours.

Two of Bourdichon's most famous works are the Hours of Louis XII (now dispersed, begun 1498) and the Grandes Heures of Anne of Brittany for Louis's queen.

References

Further reading
Backhouse, Janet, A Masterpiece Reconstructed: The Hours of Louis XII, (Eds Thomas Kren, Mark L. Evans), 2005, Getty Publications, 9780892368297 (fully online)

External links 

1457 births
1521 deaths
Manuscript illuminators
15th-century French painters
French male painters
16th-century French painters